General Sir Robert Hadden Haining,  (28 July 1882 – 15 September 1959) was a senior British Army officer during the Second World War.

Early life and education
Haining was born in Chester, the eldest son of Dr. William Haining and Mary Ellen Roberts. He was educated at Uppingham School and at the Royal Military Academy, Woolwich.

Military career
After Woolwich, Haining was commissioned into the Royal Artillery in 1900. He served during the First World War, where he was awarded the Distinguished Service Order (DSO) in 1915 and mentioned in dispatches six times throughout the war.

After attending the Staff College, Camberley from 1920 to 1921, he returned there as an instructor from 1922 to 1924. Haining was appointed Assistant Adjutant and Quartermaster General for the 2nd Division based at Aldershot in 1928 and then became a General Staff Officer in 4th Division at Colchester in 1930. He served in Military Operations in the War Office from 1931 to 1933, becoming deputy director of Military Operations and Intelligence at the War Office in 1933. He became Commandant of the Imperial Defence College in 1935 and Director of Military Operations and Intelligence at the War Office in 1936. He was appointed General Officer Commanding British Forces in Palestine and Trans-Jordan in 1938.

At the outbreak of the Second World War, Haining was appointed General Officer Commanding-in-Chief Western Command and moved on to be Vice Chief of the Imperial General Staff in 1940. He was appointed Intendant General for Middle East Forces in 1941: Prime Minister Winston Churchill described the role of an Intendant General to be that of "serving the Commander-in-Chief with the largest possible measure of supplies". He retired from the British Army in 1942.

Haining was Colonel Commandant of the Royal Artillery from 1939 to 1950.

Retirement and death
In retirement Haining became active in civil life and was Lord Lieutenant of Surrey.

Haining died in September 1959, aged 77.

Following his death, his friend George Richard Hodges Nugent (later Baron Nugent of Guildford) wrote to The Times to remark on Haining's character and post-retirement life:

References

Bibliography

External links
Generals of World War II

 

|-

|-

|-
 

|-

|-

1882 births
1959 deaths
People from Chester
People educated at Uppingham School
Graduates of the Royal Military Academy, Woolwich
Royal Artillery officers
British Army personnel of World War I
British Army generals of World War II
Knights Commander of the Order of the Bath
Lord-Lieutenants of Surrey
Companions of the Distinguished Service Order
English justices of the peace
British military personnel of the 1936–1939 Arab revolt in Palestine
Graduates of the Staff College, Camberley
Graduates of the Royal College of Defence Studies
Academics of the Staff College, Camberley
Military personnel from Chester